John William King (October 10, 1916 – August 9, 1996) was an American lawyer, jurist, and Democratic politician from Manchester, New Hampshire. He received his undergraduate degree from Harvard College and his law degree from Columbia Law School in 1943. He practiced law in Manchester and served in the New Hampshire House of Representatives. In 1962 he was elected governor of New Hampshire, becoming only the third Democratic governor of the Granite State in 88 years, and the first since Fred Herbert Brown lost the 1924 election. After his three terms as the 71st governor of New Hampshire, he served on the New Hampshire Supreme Court from 1979, and as its Chief Justice from 1981 until 1986.

As Governor, King instituted the first state lottery in the nation since 1894. He was a major hawk and a fierce supporter of President Lyndon B. Johnson during the Vietnam War and the 1968 presidential election.

During his attacks on Senator Eugene McCarthy, Johnson's challenger in the New Hampshire primary, King questioned McCarthy's national loyalty and also warned that a strong vote for "the appeaser," would be "greeted with cheers in Hanoi."

King was a Roman Catholic and after his death in 1996 he was buried in the New St. Joseph's Cemetery in Bedford, New Hampshire.

References

External links
King at New Hampshire's Division of Historic Resources
National Governors Association profile

1916 births
1996 deaths
Politicians from Manchester, New Hampshire
Columbia Law School alumni
New Hampshire lawyers
Democratic Party members of the New Hampshire House of Representatives
Democratic Party governors of New Hampshire
Chief Justices of the New Hampshire Supreme Court
20th-century American lawyers
20th-century American judges
Harvard College alumni
Catholics from New Hampshire
20th-century American politicians